The Clouded Yellow is a 1950 British mystery film directed by Ralph Thomas and produced by Betty E. Box for Carillon Films. A dismissed secret service agent falls in love with a disturbed young woman who is wrongly accused of murder and the two go on the run, pursued by the police, the secret service, and the real murderer.

Plot
A successful member of the UK Secret Intelligence Service during the Second World War, ex-Major David Somers is dismissed following the failure of a mission. The only work he can find is cataloguing butterflies at the country house of Nicholas and Jess Fenton. (The "clouded yellow" is a rare species of butterfly.) Somers and Sophie Malraux, Jess's niece, become attracted to each other. After the murder of Hick, a local gamekeeper and Jess's lover, suspicion wrongly falls on Sophie. She is considered mentally fragile because of the apparent suicide of her parents when she was six, the memory of which she has suppressed.

Somers helps Sophie to evade arrest, and they go on the run together, with Somers using his secret service skills and contacts to stay one step ahead of the police and Willy Shepley, an SIS agent. After a cross-country chase, the pair arrive at Liverpool with the intention of leaving the country by ship. The true identity of the murderer of Hick is revealed to be Sophie's uncle Nicholas, who also killed Sophie's parents because her father was another of Jess's lovers. Nicholas chases Sophie onto a warehouse roof, where he slips and falls in the path of a passing train.

Cast

Production

Development
Ralph Thomas and Betty Box had both worked for her brother, Sydney Box, first collaborating when Thomas did the trailer for Miranda (1948). They found they had a rapport, so when Shepherd's Bush Studio shut down, and Thomas left Sydney Box to go under contract to the Rank Organisation, Betty Box came with him. Their first film together was The Clouded Yellow. It was made for Betty Box's company, Carillon Films.

The Clouded Yellow was based on an original script by Janet Green. It was developed by Sydney Box but he had decided to take a year long absence and gave the project to Box and Thomas. Green was paid £1,000. They wanted further work done on the script but Janet Green was unavailable and Eric Ambler was hired to do work on it.

Jean Simmons, who had made So Long at the Fair with Box, agreed to play the lead. Trevor Howard was borrowed from Herbert Wilcox, who had him under contract, to play the male lead.

Production coincided with a crisis in the British film industry – Betty Box says it was the only film being made in England in the first half of 1950.  She managed to secure a distribution contract with Rank, which enabled her to borrow enough money to finance 70% of the budget. Box managed to raise the rest from Rank and the National Film Finance Corporation, each putting up fifty percent. However, after Betty Box had signed all 48 of the contracts required by the bank, James Laurie of the NFFC decided he did not like the contract and withdrew his company's finance until changes were made. Rank refused to provide Box with finance to tide her over, so the producer borrowed the money against her own home. "I obviously wasn't happy about the situation, particularly as it was through no fault of my own", Box later wrote. Finance did not come through until five weeks into the film. "It was a brave thing for her to do and she didn't tell me until the picture was finished", said Thomas.

Shooting
Shooting took place in Newcastle, Liverpool and the Lake District. A significant proportion of the action was shot on location in Newcastle upon Tyne, featuring scenes on the quayside, around the Castle Keep and the Central Station, and the suburb of Jesmond. Some scenes were filmed in Liverpool's Chinatown, Toxteth, Liverpool Docks and on the Liverpool Overhead Railway, closed in 1956 and later dismantled.

Thomas said he enjoyed making the movie. Maxwell Reed said his role was "not a big part but it's the best I've ever had." The supporting cast features a young Kenneth More.

Reception
The movie benefited from publicity arising out of Jean Simmons' engagement and marriage to Stewart Granger. It was also helped by the fact Trevor Howard and Simmons were among the most popular stars at the British box office.

Box later wrote "the film finally opened to very good press notices and even better business, and the teething problems were forgotten as the tills started ringing sweet music. I found I'd done a better deal for myself than I realised – every time I'd had to put up another unit of finance I was due for an extra percentage of profit – and I felt that at last justice was being done. The profits were useful for keeping my head above water as Ralph and I prepared our next production and I looked out for good film stories to buy."

"I'm rather proud of that film", said Thomas. "Jean Simmons was lovely in it, so was Trevor Howard; it was a very good movie. And Sonia Dresdel was very good value for money; they don't make them like her any more – wonderful bravura."

The Observer called it "a very foolish picture". However, The New York Times was one of the film's many admirers, saying that "A first-rate job of fast film-making in a crisp, naturalistic style, up and down the actual face of England, has been accomplished by all hands."

Thomas and Box would make a number of other thrillers in their career, including Venetian Bird.

References

External links

The Clouded Yellow at Britmovie
 The Clouded Yellow review at www.VideoVista.net

1951 films
1950s mystery films
British mystery films
British black-and-white films
Films about amnesia
Films set in Liverpool
Films set in London
Films set in Newcastle upon Tyne
Films directed by Ralph Thomas
Films produced by Betty Box
Films scored by Benjamin Frankel
1950s English-language films
1950s British films